Sorrel Hays (August 6, 1941 – February 9, 2020) was an American pianist, composer and artist.

Life
Hays was born Doris Ernestine Hays was born in Memphis, Tennessee, and in 1985 adopted her grandmother's family name of Sorrel. She studied music with Harold Cadek at the University of Tennessee at Chattanooga, graduating in 1963. She continued her education for three years studying with Friedrich Wührer and Hedwig Bilgram at the Hochschule für Musik in Munich, Germany. She then studied with Paul Badura-Skoda and Rudolf Kolisch at the University of Wisconsin in Madison, graduating with a Master of Music degree.

After completing her studies, Hays taught at Cornell College in Iowa, and then moved to New York City where she studied with  pianist Hilde Somer. In 1971 she won first prize in the Gaudeamus Competition for Interpreters of New Music at Rotterdam, and began an international career as a pianist. She is now known as one of the world's foremost performers of cluster piano music.

In 1998 Hays was director of a graduate program in electronic music at Yildiz University, Istanbul. She also taught as a guest lecturer at colleges and universities including Vassar and Brooklyn College.

Works
Hays composed for stage, films, chamber ensemble and electronic performance. Selected works include:
Our Giraffe, opera (libretto by Charles Flowers)
Hands and Lights for piano strings with photocell activated switches and flashlights (1972)
Tunings for string quartet
The Glass Woman, opera
Traveling, based on the microtonal fluctuations of tone generators
Debushing America 
Take A Back Country Road electronic saxophone, oboe and DX-7
Celebration of NO from Beyond Violence, electronic tape
Southern Voices for soprano and orchestra

She also worked as a film maker, producing films including:
Disarming the World/Pulling Its Leg, docudrama
C.D., The Ritual of Civil Disobedience, experimental documentary
The composition and premiere of her work for soprano and orchestra Southern Voices is the subject of a documentary directed by George Stoney.

Discography
Hays' music has been recorded and issued on media including:
Dreaming the World, New World Records 
Soundbridge, "90's, A Calendar Bracelet" Opus One 152
Tone Over Tone, "Past Present and Bits" Opus One 135 
Tellus #17, "Un-Necessary Music"  Video Arts Music
Voicings for Tape/Soprano/Piano Smithsonian Folkways 
M.O.M. ‘N P.O.P. for three pianos, Centaur Records  
Sleepers, "Hush"  Finnadar /Atlantic 90266
Adoration of the Clash, "Sunday Nights" on Finnadar/Atlantic 
Riverrun, "Celebration of NO" and "Sound Shadows" on Wergo 
Sorrel Doris Hays Plays Henry Cowell on Townhall Records
Live performance from the Cowell festival, Berkeley 1997, on New Albion

References

1941 births
2020 deaths
20th-century classical composers
American music educators
American women music educators
American women classical composers
American classical composers
People from Memphis, Tennessee
Musicians from Tennessee
University of Tennessee at Chattanooga alumni
University of Wisconsin–Madison College of Letters and Science alumni
Hochschule für Musik Hanns Eisler Berlin alumni
Cornell College faculty
American women in electronic music
20th-century American women musicians
20th-century American musicians
20th-century American composers
20th-century women composers
American women academics
21st-century American women